Kristian Gjessing (born 15 January 1978) is a Danish handball player, currently playing for Danish Handball League side AaB Håndbold. He has previously played for Skjern Håndbold and Spanish side BM Altea.

Gjessing has made 50 appearances for the Danish national handball team.

References

External links
 player info

1978 births
Living people
Danish male handball players
Sportspeople from Aarhus